The Jamaica women's national football team has represented Jamaica at the FIFA Women's World Cup at one staging of the tournament, in 2019.

FIFA Women's World Cup record

*Draws include knockout matches decided on penalty kicks.

Record by opponent

2019 FIFA Women's World Cup

Group C

2023 FIFA Women's World Cup

Group F

Goalscorers

References

 
Countries at the FIFA Women's World Cup